United Nations General Assembly Resolution 1654 of 27 November 1961, titled "The situation with regard to the implementation of the Declaration on the Granting of Independence to Colonial Countries and Peoples" was a resolution of the United Nations General Assembly during its sixteenth session. It reaffirmed the Declaration on the Granting of Independence to Colonial Countries and Peoples in Resolution 1514 (XV) of 14 December 1960.

See also 
 United Nations list of non-self-governing territories
 Decolonization
 Dependent territory

External links 
 The situation with regard to the implementation of the Declaration on the Granting of Independence to Colonial Countries and Peoples
 United Nations Trusteeship Agreements or were listed by the General Assembly as Non-Self-Governing

1654
1961 in law
1961 in the United Nations
November 1961 events
Decolonization